Blitz Brigade is a multiplayer first-person shooter video game developed and published by Gameloft for iOS, Android, and Windows Mobile.

Gameplay
Blitz Brigade is an online team-based first-person shooter, with two "campaign" modes—multiplayer and training. The player can play as part of either Allies or Axis team. Training mode is an online single-player mode with 120 unlockable training missions. Multiplayer mode offers deathmatch and domination (capture) across 5 levels. A later update added a capture the flag mode. The player can play as one of 6 unlockable classes. The game feature two in-game currencies and new weapons can be purchased.

Reception

The iOS version received "mixed" reviews according to the review aggregation website Metacritic. Eric Ford of TouchArcade described it as enjoyable, but noted lack of game modes and freemium content. Rob Rich of Gamezebo described the game as good-looking and having elements for a great online mobile FPS, but criticized online server stability that he remarked as a key requirement. Jon Mundy of Pocket Gamer noted the framework for and excellent online FPS but criticized its freemium aspect and online stability. Andrew Stevens of 148Apps described the gameplay as fun and smooth, but lacking content. Scott Nichols of Digital Spy praised class-based gameplay and cartoony art style, but noted the poor connectivity and steep unlock requirements. Ford, Mundy and Nichols noted the game's close similarity to Team Fortress 2.

References

External links

2013 video games
Android (operating system) games
First-person shooter multiplayer online games
First-person shooters
Gameloft games
IOS games
Multiplayer online games
Online games
Video games developed in Romania
Windows Mobile games